Vinay Katiyar (born 11 November 1954) is a politician and 
the founder-president of Bajrang Dal, the youth wing of the Hindu nationalist organisation Vishwa Hindu Parishad (VHP) in India. He has served as an All India General Secretary of the Bharatiya Janata Party (BJP), and as a Member of Parliament in both the Lok Sabha and the Rajya Sabha.

Life and career
Katiyar was born to Devi Charan Katiyar and Shyam Kali in Kanpur. He holds a bachelor's degree in Commerce from Kanpur University.

Katiyar started his political journey with Akhil Bharatiya Vidyarthi Parishad (ABVP), the student wing of the Sangh Parivar. He was the organizing secretary of ABVP's Uttar Pradesh state unit from 1970 to 1974, and the convener of the Jayaprakash Narayan's Bihar Movement in 1974. He became a pracharak (full-time worker) of the Rashtriya Swayamsevak Sangh (RSS) in 1980. He founded the Hindu Jagran Manch in 1982. In 1984, he was chosen to start the new youth organisation Bajrang Dal to support the Ram Janmabhoomi movement.

Later, Katiyar served as the President of Uttar Pradesh State Unit of the Bharatiya Janata Party from 2002 to 18 July 2004 and the national General Secretary of the BJP from 2006.

Katiyar was elected to the Lok Sabha from the Faizabad (Ayodhya) constituency to the 10th, 11th and 13th Lok Sabha in 1991, 1996 and 1999, and to the Rajya Sabha as a representative of Uttar Pradesh in 2012.

Controversies 
In a 2018 interview with ANI, Katiyar said that there was no need for Muslims to remain in India in the wake of its Partition, and that Muslims in India should, instead, move to Pakistan or Bangladesh. These views were shared after his comments about the Taj Mahal, claiming that the monument was a Hindu temple in the period of Aurangzeb's rule and implied that it would soon be returned to its 'original state' through its destruction.

References

1954 births
Living people
Members of the Uttar Pradesh Legislative Assembly
Bharatiya Janata Party politicians from Uttar Pradesh
People from Kanpur
Chhatrapati Shahu Ji Maharaj University alumni
People from Faizabad district
Bajrang Dal members
Far-right politicians in India
India MPs 1991–1996
India MPs 1996–1997
India MPs 1999–2004
Rajya Sabha members from Uttar Pradesh
Lok Sabha members from Uttar Pradesh